Boris McGiver (born January 23, 1962) is an American actor. He is known for his roles in projects such as Lincoln, House of Cards, The Wire, Killing Kennedy, and Person of Interest.

Personal life
Of Irish and Ukrainian descent, McGiver is the second youngest of ten children born to actor John McGiver and his wife, Ruth Schmigelsky McGiver. He was not initially eager to follow in his father's footsteps and has stated, "I kind of denied it [acting] throughout my childhood because my dad was an actor and he was never around. He had to feed 10 kids, he was always working, so to me acting was never connected to something good, and I had never realized what an art it was. I thought it was just playtime."

Filmography

Film

Television

References

External links
 
 

American male film actors
American male television actors
American people of Irish descent
American people of Ukrainian descent
Living people
Male actors from New York (state)
People from Cobleskill, New York
1962 births
20th-century American male actors
21st-century American male actors
University at Albany, SUNY alumni
Ithaca College alumni
New York University alumni